Arnoldo López Echandi is a politician who served as Second Vice President of Costa Rica and Ambassador of Costa Rica to France. He also served as President of International Coffee Organization.

References 

Vice presidents of Costa Rica